The Corporation for New Jersey Local Media is a non-profit media corporation. In April 2022, it assumed ownership of the New Jersey Hills Media Group, making it the largest non-profit weekly newspaper chain in the United States.

References

Newspapers published in New Jersey